Njoku Nnamdi is a Nigerian politician and member of the 4th National Assembly representing Bende constituency of Abia State under the umbrella of the People's Democratic Party.

See also
 Nigerian National Assembly delegation from Abia

References

People from Abia State
Living people
Igbo politicians
Peoples Democratic Party members of the House of Representatives (Nigeria)
Year of birth missing (living people)